Ó hUiginn is the surname of a Gaelic-Irish family of soldiers, poets, and historians located in Connacht. Originally part of the southern Uí Néill based in the Irish midlands, they moved west into Connacht. They were especially associated with what is now County Sligo, settling at Dooghorne, Achonry and Ballynary, as well as other locations in County Mayo, County Roscommon and County Galway. More than half of those bearing the surname in Ireland today still live in Connacht. The name is commonly anglicised as Higgins or O'Higgins.

Notables
 Tadc Ó hUiginn, a general master of all arts connected with poetry, died 1315
 Gilla na Neamh Ó hUiginn, poet (died 1346)
 Fercert Ó hUiginn, head of the family descended from Gilla na Neamh Ó h-Uiginn (died 1418)
 Lochlainn, son of Fercert Ó hUiginn (died 1464)
 Doighre Ó hUiginn, scribe of The Book of Magauran
Peter B.C O'Huiginn, actor (1943-2017), Often credited as Brogan C.Ohiginn 
 Donnchad Ó hUiginn, a learned historian (died 1364)
 Maol Sheachluinn na n-Uirsgéal Ó hUiginn (fl. c. 1400)
 Niall mac Aed Ó hUiginn (fl. 1414)
 Tadg Óg Ó hUiginn, chief teacher [of the poets] of Ireland and Scotland (died at the end of the same spring, 1448)
 Elec Ní hUicinn (murdered 1471)
 Brian Ó hUiginn, head of his own tribe, superintendent of the schools of Ireland, and preceptor in poetry, died on Maunday Thursday 1476; interred at Ath-leathan
 Bishop Ó hUiginn, Bishop of Mayo (died 1478)
 Gilla-Patrick Ó hUiginn, son of Brian and grandson of Melaghlin, a man who had kept a general house of hospitality for the mighty and the indigent (died 1485)
 Philip Bocht Ó hUiginn, Irish poet (died 1487) 
 Maelmuire son of Tadc Oc O hUiginn, a master of poetry (died 1488)
 Sean mac Fergail Óicc Ó hUiccinn (died 1490)
 Tadhg Mór Ó hUiginn, poet 
 Cairbre, son of Brian O hUiginn, died at Westmeath (1505)
 Brian Oge, son of Brian and grandson of Donnell Cam O'Higgin (died 1505)
 Eogan, son of Brian Óge Ó hUiginn, Chief Preceptor of all Ireland, died 1510
 Gilla-Coluim Ó hUiginn, Irish poet. The son of Maelmuire and Brian Og Ó hUiginn; first cousin of the father of Tadhg Dall Ó hUiginn; died three nights before Lammas (in 1587)
 Conchobhar, son of Enna O'hUiginn, died: a most eminent poet was this Conchobhar; interred at Caisel-na-heilidhi, Machaire-na-nailech (in 1587)
 Tadhg Dall Ó hUiginn, (c. 1550 - c. 1591), poet (murdered ca. 1591)
 Ambrosio O'Higgins, 1st Marquis of Osorno (1720-1801), Viceroy of Peru for Spain
 Higgins of Tyrawley (fl. 18th century), harper
 Bernardo O'Higgins, (1788-1842), first head of state of Chile
 Brian O'Higgins (1882–1963), Irish writer and poet
 Kevin O’Higgins (1892-1927), Irish Free State minister, 1922–1927. 
 Thomas Francis O'Higgins (1916–2003), Irish politician, barrister, a judge
 Michael D. Higgins (born 18 April 1941), 9th President of Ireland 
 Michéal Ó hUiginn (born 1942), Mayor of Galway (1972–73, 1979–80, 1995–96)

See also
 O'Higgins (disambiguation)
 O'Higgins (surname)
 O'Higgins clan

References

 http://www.irishtimes.com/ancestor/surname/index.cfm?fuseaction=History&Surname=higgins&UserID=
 http://www.ohigginsclan.com/welcome.htm

Surnames
Irish families
Irish Brehon families
Surnames of Irish origin
Irish-language surnames
Families of Irish ancestry